Townhead is an area of the city of Glasgow, Scotland. It is situated immediately north-east of Glasgow city centre and contains a residential sector (redeveloped from an older neighbourhood in the mid 20th century, largely with tower blocks), a commercial/industrial sector and an educational zone containing the main campuses of both the University of Strathclyde and City of Glasgow College.

Location
In ancient times, Townhead was an undeveloped area situated north of the cathedral and town with no definitive boundaries. Today, it is bordered to the west by Cowcaddens, to the north by Sighthill, to the east by Royston and Ladywell/Dennistoun and to the south by the Merchant City. The notional boundaries of Townhead are thus North Hanover Street and Dobbie's Loan to the west, the M8 motorway to the north, Castle Street and High Street to the east and George Street to the south.

Housing
Housing is primarily ex-council stock (Glasgow has no council houses since their transfer to the Glasgow Housing Association), although the area contains a large number of student residences for International Christian College, Glasgow Caledonian University and Strathclyde University.  Most of the housing units are fairly modern 8 in a block flats, although its most visually obvious features are the four 24-storey high-rise flats named "2 Taylor Place", "15 Grafton Place", "7 St Mungo's Place" and "12 Dobbies Loan Place".

History 

It is widely accepted that near the eastern edge of modern day Townhead, is where St Kentigern, also known as St Mungo, built his church by the banks of the Molendinar Burn and thus established Glasgow.  Glasgow Cathedral, dedicated to St Mungo, is roughly situated where Mungo's original church once stood.  The present building dates back to the 12th century.  Today, the Cathedral sits immediately outside of Townhead's boundaries and falls into the Ladywell area.

Provand's Lordship, Glasgow's oldest remaining house, was constructed from the late 15th century by Bishop Andrew, later given the surname Muirhead as part of St Nicholas Hospital, a lodging for the poor. The hospital, or more accurately a hospitium, provided accommodation for twelve poor men as well their care who contributed through work in the hospital, Bible study and a products from the gardens. The gardens were restored in 1997 and like the original St Nicolas garden, the herb grown are those known for healing properties and medicinal use.

The martyrdom of the Covenanters took place in the modern area called Townhead. The northern part of Castle Street was the town limits beyond which was called the "Howgait". Howgait was the scene of public hangings and used until 1781, when they moved to Glasgow Green. The area is now mainly taken up by Junction 15 of the M8.

The former Martyrs' Church building (moved to its current location in 1975 and then closed by members vote in 2011) contained until September 2013 the Martyrs stone, which details the executions in 1684 of James Nisbet (a farmer from Louden Parish in Ayrshire), James Lawson and Alex Wood. The stone, which originally stood in front of Townhead library, along with a large part of the once densely packed Townhead, was demolished to make way for the M8 motorway. The stone can now be found in the church wall of "The Evangelical Church" which is at the South East side of Cathedral square.  Martyrs church also contained the "Martyrs church bell", which was preserved from the old Martyrs West church building until 2013 at which point, finding no new home, the bell was melted.  The church of Scotland is currently seeking a buyer for the land which has planning permission for an extensive housing development and community building.

The Church of Scotland still supporting Townhead through the parish ministry of Glasgow Cathedral and by giving temporary accommodation to SIMY Community Development charity which was formally an active part of the previous church's parish care. Since closure, SIMY has become an independent, local volunteer lead charity providing youth work support, arts provision, sports coaching, life skills, outdoor education, drop in diversionary clubs and is a DofE centre. SiMY owes its survival to the support it receives from the Church, Iona Community, Townhead community council, AplusM training, Glasgow Housing Association, Glasgow Community Safety Services, Glasgow Life and a dedicated group of volunteers many of whom have grown up in the local area or work nearby.

St Mungo's Church, Parson Street (George Goldie, 1869) is Italiante-Gothic in style. 70 Parson Street is the birthplace of architect Charles Rennie MacIntosh, who also aided in the design of Martyr's School, at 17 Parson Street.

In line with post-war gentrification going on in Glasgow at the time, and in line with recommendations from the Bruce Report, the 1960s saw great change in Townhead. Like Anderston and the Gorbals, Townhead was designated a Comprehensive Development Area (CDA), which meant that much of the existing buildings would be cleared and its population rehomed. New multi-storey housing in tower blocks replaced the slum tenements, whilst others were moved to new estates on the outer fringes of the city. As a result, very few of the original tenements in Townhead have survived. The Glasgow Inner Ring Road would also cut a tranche through the area, although the controversial eastern flank (which would have literally wiped out a whole tranche of the present day Merchant City) was abandoned in the late 1970s. The plans also entailed the complete demolition and rebuilding of Glasgow Royal Infirmary, however the scheme was eventually scaled back and the original Victorian hospital was given an indefinite stay of execution. The artist Joan Eardley captured much of this redevelopment from her studio in Townhead.

The southern reaches of the area were cleared to make way for the burgeoning campus of the newly established University of Strathclyde, which had grown from the Royal College of Science and Technology.  Here can be found the most famous and oldest of Townhead's streets – Rottenrow. It was from this high vantage point at the top of Balmanno Brae that St. Mungo could see, south, down to the River Clyde and be forewarned of the approach of any hostile people. Rottenrow was also home to the Glasgow Royal Maternity Hospital. This hospital is now demolished and replaced by a garden.

Recent developments
Townhead has a community council of local volunteers. Recently Townhead was merged for community council purposes with the neighbouring Ladywell area of Glasgow. This resulted in the formation of Townhead and Ladywell Community Council. The community council members were instrumental in obtaining the funding for a village hall in Townhead, which opened in 2013. They were less successful in obtaining planning concessions in relation to a massive campus development being built in Townhead by City of Glasgow College.  Although this area of Townhead had long been zoned for educational use as far back as the 1950s, the community council had expressed concerns about the proximity of the development to residential property, and argued for special planning conditions to be included given the potential for disruption to local people. Townhead has witnessed an abnormally high number of applications to convert standard homes into Houses of Multiple occupation (bedsits). The local community council has been at the forefront of articulating the local community's concerns in this regard.

The recent sell off of the Glasgow Cathedral, Martyrs church building Removed a key community meeting space from the community and is due to add more student housing to the area.

SIMY Community Development, a large local volunteer-run youth and community charity, are backed by the community council in efforts to develop new youth work for young people in Townhead by transporting to other areas as Townhead no longer as any indoor sports areas.  The demolition of the Martyrs church will be the third large community building removed from the area since 2012 which saw the closure of St David School and The Hurdy Gurdy.  It will also remove the only indoor sports courts still available to the public and community groups in the G4 / South G21 area.

SiMY's silver DofE groups were working to improve the environment around the form Martyrs church building aesthetically as well as making it a useful place for them once the building is demolished.  They were unsuccessful in their submitted plan for "stalled spaces" project as the General trustees of the church of Scotland were concerns that any work could hamper sale of the land.  The DofE's group plans were supported by the "Townhead and Ladywell Community Council" and so are seeking advice from Glasgow Planning about possibilities.

The Martyrs stone was moved on 12 September 2013 to the Glasgow Evangelical Church in Cathedral square by Glasgow City Council at the request of the Glasgow Evangelical Church and the Scottish Covenanter Memorials Association to Cathedral Square, a historical centre of Glasgow, where it can be seen by Glaswegians and tourists.

The Townhead Village Hall opened in 2013 and provides for social activities and services for the Townhead community.  The building and the land on which it has been built is owned by a community led company. With the recent changes preventing school lets in St Mungos School, the Village Hall is now the only facilities with space for community activities and functions.  The hall is in use every day and evening providing vital services to the local community and private function space Thursday - Sunday.  In Nov 2013 the village hall opened their Townhead Orchard providing a green space for local residence to enjoy gardening and tree maintenance under the supervision of centre staff during opening hours.  The garden is protected by a high fence and security cameras.

In 2013, Townhead's status as the city's largest educational zone was expanded with planning applications being received for increased student accommodation to match the new large college campus for the area.  This is part of the council's 2013-2018 development strategy for the area

Transport links
Townhead is also well situated for transport links with Glasgow Queen Street Station and Buchanan bus station on its doorstep.

See also
 Glasgow tower blocks
 List of tallest buildings and structures in Glasgow

References

External links
Strathclyde University
Great Men of Glasgow

Areas of Glasgow